Emanuel Coronel (born 1 February 1997) is an Argentine professional footballer who plays as a right-back for Banfield.

Career
Coronel was promoted into Banfield's first-team during 2017–18. He made his professional debut for the Argentine Primera División club on 3 February 2018, featuring for the full duration of a goalless draw at home to Atlético Tucumán. Coronel made one further appearance in his opening campaign versus Talleres, whilst also being an unused substitute on four occasions.

Career statistics
.

References

External links

1997 births
Living people
People from Chicligasta Department
Argentine footballers
Association football defenders
Argentine Primera División players
Primera Nacional players
Club Atlético Banfield footballers
Club Atlético Brown footballers